Imtiaz Ali (born 28 July 1954 in Maraval, Trinidad and Tobago) is a former West Indian cricketer of Indian descent who played in one Test against India in 1976.

References

External links

1954 births
Living people
West Indies Test cricketers
Trinidad and Tobago cricketers
East Trinidad cricketers